Scarlet Riders is a collection of Northern short stories originally published in pulp magazines.  The book's subtitle is "Pulp Fiction Tales of The Mounties".  It was edited by Don Hutchison who also provides an introduction covering pulp magazines and the Northern genre as well the writers and stories themselves.

Contents

Scarlet Riders contains the following stories:

 "Deadly Trek to Albertville" by Talmage Powell
Originally published in Posse, March 1957
 "The Frozen Phantom" by Lester Dent
Originally published in Western Trails, April 1933
 "Spoilers of the Lost World" by Roger Daniels
Originally published in North-West Romances, Fall 1938
 "White Water Run" by Hugh B. Cave
Originally published in Western Story Magazine, 14 February 1942
 "Red Snows" by Harold F. Cruickshank
Originally published in Thrilling Adventures, February 1938
 "The Driving Force" by Murray Leinster
Originally published in Complete Northwest Magazine, July 1938
 "Snow Ghost" by Lester Dent, featuring The Silver Corporal
Originally published in Western Trails, May–June 1933
 "Phantom Fangs" by John Starr
Originally published in North-West Romances, Spring 1942
 "The Dangerous Dan McGrew" by Ryerson Johnson
Originally published in Ace-High Magazine, 2 March 1931
 "Death Cache" by Lester Dent, featuring The Silver Corporal
Previously unpublished
 "Doom Ice" by Dan O'Rourke
Originally published in North-West Romances, Summer 1942
 "The Valley of Wanted Men" by Frederick Nebel
Originally published in North-West Romances, Spring 1940

References

1998 anthologies
Canadian anthologies
Pulp stories
Works originally published in pulp magazines
Royal Canadian Mounted Police in fiction